Kleifarvatn is the largest lake on the Reykjanes Peninsula in Iceland, situated in the southern part of the peninsula. It is located on the fissure zone of the Mid-Atlantic Ridge.  The lake has no visible water coming in or going out as most of its water comes and leaves underground. The lake can be reached via a track, and there are two areas with high temperature that can be found not far from it: Seltún/Krýsuvík and another to the east. The lake's greatest depth is 97 m. After the 2000 Iceland earthquakes, the lake began to diminish, and 20% of its surface has since disappeared.

 

The novel Kleifarvatn by Icelandic writer Arnaldur Indriðason was named after the lake.

See also 
List of lakes of Iceland
Volcanism of Iceland

References

External links
Photos
 More information and photos about Kleifarvatn on Hit Iceland
Kleifarvatn – Photo gallery 
"Iceland Lake Disappearing Into New Crack in Earth", Bijal P. Trivedi, National Geographic Today, October 1, 2001

Krýsuvík Volcanic System
Lakes of Iceland
Reykjanes
Rift lakes of Iceland